Taana may refer to:
Thaana  or Tāna, the writing system for the Maldivian language
The initial title of film Kaaki Sattai
Taana (film), 2020 Tamil film
Taana Gardner, an American disco and post-disco singer 
"Ghoom Taana", a song by Pakistani sufi rock band Junoon

See also
Tana (disambiguation)